George Richardson Jr. was a shortstop with the Chicago Union Giants the Algona Brownies from 1900 to 1903.

References

External links
 and Seamheads

Algona Brownies players
Chicago Unions players
Year of birth missing
Year of death missing